Gustavo Adolfo Bobadilla Orrego (born 17 February 1959) is a Paraguayan football coach and former player who played as a goalkeeper. He is the current manager of Sol de América.

Playing career
Born in Paraguay, Bobadilla started his career at Olimpia Asunción where he played for 12 years mostly as a substitute to the star of Ever Hugo Almeida. While in Olimpia, he won several national championships between 1979 and 1988. He then went on to play for Atlético Colegiales and Sportivo Luqueño before going to Peru to play for teams like Club Deportivo Municipal and FBC Melgar. He also had a brief stint in Club Sol de América in 1984.

While playing in Peru, Bobadilla sported the emblem of Sportivo Luqueño in his jerseys to show the love for the team and the city of Luque.

Coaching career
Bobadilla managed the youth divisions of teams like Olimpia, Sol de América, Guaraní and the Paraguay national team. In Peru, he coached Melgar FBC.
and in the second division of Paraguay, the teams of Resistencia and Independiente de Campo Grande.

References

Living people
1959 births
Paraguayan footballers
Club Olimpia footballers
Sportivo Luqueño players
Club Sol de América footballers
Atlético Colegiales players
Deportivo Municipal footballers
FBC Melgar footballers
Peruvian Primera División players
Paraguayan football managers
Club Tacuary managers
FBC Melgar managers
Peruvian Primera División managers
Association football goalkeepers
Club General Caballero (Juan León Mallorquín) managers
Club Sol de América managers
Independiente F.B.C. managers